Bruce Edward McNorton (born February 28, 1959) is an American former professional football player who played cornerback for the Detroit Lions of the National Football League.

His daughter, Brittney McNorton, is married to former Lions All-Pro receiver Calvin Johnson.

References

1959 births
Living people
Sportspeople from Daytona Beach, Florida
American football cornerbacks
Detroit Lions players
Players of American football from Florida
Ed Block Courage Award recipients